Mark van Oppen (Zolder, Belgium, 29 April 1953) better known as Marvano, is a Belgian comic artist. He is most famous for the Forever War, in collaboration with Joe Haldeman.

Biography
Born in 1953 in Belgium, he studied interior architecture before working as an illustrator and starting to draw graphic novels. Probably his best-known work is the collaboration with Joe Haldeman on the Forever War graphic novel, an adaptation of the award-winning The Forever War novel. Marvano and Haldeman also worked together on  comic adaptations of its direct sequel Forever Free  and of the novel Buying time called Dallas Barr.
Afterwards he did comic books in a historical setting, like Berlin (Berlin in Germany during and after World War II) and Grand Prix (about grand prix racers during the 1930s).

References

 Marvano at Bedetheque 

Belgian comics artists
Belgian comics writers
Belgian architects
Living people
1953 births